Christopher Lamont Bender (August 2, 1972 – November 3, 1991) was an American R&B singer who reached the national music charts in 1991 with the album entitled Draped before his murder.

Life and career
Christopher Lamont Bender was the youngest of six children to Andrew Bender, a construction worker and Betty Ann Bender, a nurse's aide. He was born on August 2, 1972, in 
Brockton, Massachusetts. The Bender family were active in church and at the age of 10 years old, Bender sang an emotional "Amazing Grace". Bender's musical influences were Michael Jackson, Prince, Sam Cooke, Marvin Gaye and New Edition. At the age of 12, Bender met Bobby Jones who owned a studio and helped Chris Bender  develop his singing voice, and they were called The Next Generation with the late Robert L Winstead as their manager. At the recording studio called Annie Mae Recording in the city of Brockton and Major recording studio called Normandy Sounds in Warren RI and At 14 years old, Bender formed a group with his two brothers and two cousins called "Steady Life", performing in Brockton. Bender was expelled from Brockton High School at 16 for fighting in school. He went to New York City and met Earl Williams who became his manager and got him a record deal with Epic Records in 1989.

Bender was from the Boston, Massachusetts, area, growing up in Brockton and Waltham. At the age of 16, Bender recorded his first album, Chris Bender, for Epic Records. The first single "Baby Girl" was released in 1989 but limited copies of the album were released. Bender's manager Terryl L. Calloway later stated about Baby Girl: " The video was never [released]. " Bender nevertheless went on to secure a $500,000 contract with EastWest Records. He signed a seven-album contract, although only one album on that contract was released before his death. The album Draped hit No. 92 on the Billboard magazine R&B album chart. His two charted singles "I Knew" and "That's Not The Way" broke into the top 70 on the Hot R&B Singles chart. Other songs he was known for included "Who Will I Choose" and "Kiss and Make Up". His first single "I Knew" peaked at #43 on Billboards R&B singles chart, staying on there for 10 weeks. The follow-up single "That's Not The Way" peaked at #68
on the Billboards Hot R&B singles chart, staying on the chart for 5 weeks. "I Knew" was his only music video.

Death
On November 3, 1991, at 2:17 am, Bender was shot and killed in Brockton while sitting in his blue Mercedes Benz outside of the Crescent Court housing project where his mother lived. Bender was sitting in the driver's seat of the car. His 17 year-old cousin, Jesse Starks, was sitting in the passenger’s seat. Bender and Starks were smoking marijuana and talking when three hooded men approached and fired 21 gunshots at the vehicle. Bender used his body to shield Starks from the gunshots. Starks was unharmed, but Bender was struck four times in the back of his torso and once in his elbow. He later died from his wounds in the hospital. On November 9, 1991, Bender was buried at Melrose Cemetery in Plymouth County in Brockton, Massachusettes. Eroy Kindell was convicted of second degree murder; he was released on parole in 2008.  His accomplice Stephen "Sticks" Fernandes was convicted of first degree murder and sentenced to life without parole.

Discography

Chris Bender (1989/CD)
1. Teddy Bear
2. Baby Girl
3. Any Good Girls Left
4. Conceited Girl
5. Never Give Up On Me
6. That's How Love Happens
7. Intimate Lover
8. Go On And Love Your Lady

Draped (1991 / CD)
1. I Knew
2. Draped
3. It's All About You
4. Spellbound
5. Prelude... Stay Til The Morning
6. Don't Go Home
7. That's Not The Way
8. Sorry Didn't Do It
9. Who Will I Choose?
10. Pouring Like Rain
11. Kiss & Make Up
12. Kiss & Make Up [The Apologize Mix]

UPC: 075679170828

References

External links

1972 births
1991 deaths
Musicians from Boston
1991 murders in the United States
American contemporary R&B singers
People murdered in Massachusetts
Deaths by firearm in Massachusetts
American murder victims
Murdered African-American people
Singers from Massachusetts
20th-century American singers
20th-century African-American musicians